Youssouf née Adidja Alim is a Cameroonian political figure. Since 2009, she has been the Minister of Basic Education.

Biography 
She was born in 1956 in the Bénoué division, in the North region of Cameroon.

Education 
She is a graduate from the National School of Administration and Magistracy (ENAM) with a specialty inspector of social affairs.

Career 
She began her professional career at the Maternity Department of the Garoua Hospital. She later became director of Garoua's House of Women

Politics

Deputation 
She is a member of the Cameroonian People's Democratic Movement (CPDM). The CPDM is the majority political party in Cameroon. She became a member of the National Assembly of Cameroon, Cameroon's parliament, for the constituency from the Benoue division.

Ministerial mandate 
During the cabinet reshuffle of June 30, 2009, she became the Minister of Basic Education.

Distinctions 
On October 24, 2015, she received the Kirei-Na Gakko Award of Excellence, awarded by the Japan International Cooperation Agency (JICA) for "Best Practices" for the maintenance and upkeep of schools in Japan. Japanese donation project in Cameroon. Cameroon is the third African country to receive this distinction after Tunisia in 2010 and Malawi in 2013.

Other projects

References

External links 

 Les gouvernements de Paul Biya : les ministres

1956 births
Cameroon People's Democratic Movement politicians
Health ministers of Cameroon
Living people
Members of the National Assembly (Cameroon)
Women government ministers of Cameroon
21st-century Cameroonian women politicians
21st-century Cameroonian politicians